In mechanics and aerodynamics, the drag area of an object represents the effective size of the object as it is "seen" by the fluid flow around it.

The drag coefficient plays a role in Reynold's drag equation,

Here,  is the drag force,  the density of the fluid, and  the speed of the object relative to the fluid.

See also
Drag (physics)
Automobile drag coefficient#Drag area
Zero-lift drag coefficient

Drag (physics)